Bolton Wanderers Reserves play their home games at the Eddie Davies Academy in Bolton.

Notable graduates of the squad include former captain Kevin Nolan, Republic of Ireland international Joey O'Brien and eventual first team regulars such as Nicky Hunt, Ricardo Vaz-Te, Josh Vela, Zach Clough and Rob Holding.

Of the current squad, graduate Aaron Morley has featured most often at senior level since re-joining Bolton in 2022, whilst Adam Senior, Finlay Lockett, Arran Pettifer, Matthew Tweedley and Lamine Toure have also made appearances for the first team squad.

History
Bolton first ever reserve team was set up in 1921.

They have won the Central League twice in 1955 and 1995. Their most recent success came in the FA Premier Reserve league in 2007.

Previous years have seen the club compete in the Avon Insurance Premier League, FA Premier League North and Professional Development League 2.

They also participated in the Manchester Senior Cup and Lancashire Senior Cup in previous years, winning their third Manchester Senior Cup as recently as 2015 and winning the Lancashire Senior Cup twelve times, the last occasion coming in 1990–91 season.

In August 2016, the U21 side was renamed as the U23 side, after a consultation involving all 31 clubs in the Professional Development League 2, voted in favour of the new age parameters.

Abolishment and Re-formation
Due to Bolton dropping to Category Three in March 2020 Bolton had no Development Squad in the 2020–21 season. This was the first time since the reserves were created in 1921 that Bolton had not had a reserve team.

After nearly a year without reserve team football, Bolton started setting up reserve friendlies in March 2021 so that their fringe players could get game time and plan to relaunch a reserve team for the 2021–2022 season. Bolton Reserves entered The Central League for the 2021–2022 season having previously been part of that competition between 1911 and 1999. They also took part in the Central League Cup.

Starting with the 2022–2023 season, the reserves rebranded to "Bolton Wanderers B" and though they originally considered leaving the Central League to instead schedule friendlies against other B teams and U23 teams, they instead decided to stay in the League and also do said friendlies as extra matches.

Grounds
Previous reserve grounds at Bolton include their old home at Burnden Park, Hilton Park the former home of Leigh Centurions, Bury's ground at Gigg Lane, Spotland Stadium, home of Rochdale and Rochdale Hornets and County Ground (Leyland).

Since re-forming in 2021, the reserve team play at the Eddie Davies Academy in Lostock.

Occasionally matches are played at the first team ground at the University of Bolton Stadium.

The Academy

The Bolton Wanderers Academy was established in 1998 and is based at the club and the main training ground. It replaced the older, more informal youth system, and enabled the club to focus their youth development and scouting, employing new techniques and FA standards.

It is currently overseen by Dave Gardiner. It provides a stepping stone for youngsters to progress to the highest levels of football at Bolton Wanderers.

Scouts attend many local youth matches looking for talented boys. A boy will then be invited to attend training sessions at the academy. They are taken in as young as the age of eight. At this age, the boys start by simply attending after-school training sessions, but as they reach their middle-teens, their academic needs will be taken over by the academy if they are deemed athletically talented enough.

Between the ages of eight and twelve the boys play in eight-a-side games of three twenty-minute periods. It allows the boys to play as defenders or as attackers in small groups within a system and is not as physically demanding as playing eleven-a-side matches.

The first player to graduate from the academy to the first team was the former club captain, Kevin Nolan who had previously been on the youth books of Liverpool. He has since been followed into the first team by Joey O'Brien, Ricardo Vaz Tê, Nicky Hunt. Josh Vela, Zach Clough and Rob Holding amongst others.

In December 2012, the Bolton Academy was awarded Elite status by the Premier League.

In June 2015, it was announced that the club had sought to downgrade from a Category One status in order to save money. In March 2020, the club announced it would down grade to Category Three.

Players

Academy (Under-18s)

As of December 2022.

Managerial History

Reserves/Development Squad/B Team
 1991–2000: Steve Carroll
 2000–2005: Neil McDonald
 2005–2008: Jimmy Phillips
 2008–2010: Alan Cork
 2010–2012: John Henry
 2013–2014: Jamie Fullarton
 2014–2016: Iain Brunskill
 2016–2020: David Lee
 2021–2022: Sam Hird
 2022–: Matt Craddock

Youth Team/Academy
 1985–1991: Steve Carroll
 1991–1998: Dean Crombie
 1998–2000: Martin Dobson
 2000–2008: Chris Sulley
 2008–2020: Jimmy Phillips
 2020–2022: Mark Litherland
 2022–: Dave Gardiner

Staff
B Team Manager:  Matt Craddock
Player/B Team Assistant Manager:  Andrew Tutte 
Academy Manager:  Dave Gardiner
Academy U-18 Coach:  Julian Darby
Academy U-16 Coach: Vacant
Academy Coach:  Fabrice Muamba 
Academy Goalkeeper Coach:  Andy Fairman
Head Academy Physiotherapist:  David Newbold
Head of Academy Education:  Alex Norwood

In addition, the academy employ staff from the first-team.

Graduates

The following players have been associated with the Bolton Wanderers Academy and have gone on to play league football for Bolton or other clubs since the academy was founded in 1998.

Academy Graduates who have made at least one senior appearance for the Bolton Wanderers first team.

Other players associated with the academy who have made at least one senior appearance for league clubs in Britain or abroad.

Notes

External links
Bolton Wanderers FC Official Website
The Academy
Team/Reserves Squad Profiles
Reserves Fixtures and Results
Under-18s Fixtures and Results

Reserves and Academy
Football academies in England
Lancashire League (football)
Lancashire Combination
West Lancashire Football League